Karoline "Lini" Söhnchen (19 July 1897 – 2 June 1978) was a German diver who competed in the 1928 Summer Olympics. She was born in Witten. In 1928 she finished sixth in the 3 metre springboard event.

References

1897 births
1978 deaths
People from Witten
Sportspeople from Arnsberg (region)
German female divers
Olympic divers of Germany
Divers at the 1928 Summer Olympics
20th-century German women